Teresa Errandonea Fernández de Barrena (born 15 November 1994) is a Spanish athlete. She competed in the women's 100 metres hurdles event at the 2020 Summer Olympics.

References

External links
 
 
 

1994 births
Living people
Spanish female hurdlers
Athletes (track and field) at the 2020 Summer Olympics
Olympic athletes of Spain
Sportspeople from Gipuzkoa
European Games competitors for Spain
Athletes (track and field) at the 2019 European Games
21st-century Spanish women